The Schilthorn is a summit in Europe, in the Bernese Alps of Switzerland. It overlooks the valley of Lauterbrunnen in the Bernese Oberland, and is the highest mountain in the range lying north of the Sefinenfurgge Pass. The Schilthorn lies above the village of Mürren, from where a cable car leads to its summit.

Administratively, the summit is within the municipality of Lauterbrunnen, although the western slopes are within the municipality of Reichenbach im Kandertal. Both municipalities are in the canton of Bern.

The summit has a panoramic view which spans from the Titlis, Jungfrau, Mönch, Eiger, over the Bernese Alps and the Jura mountains up to the Vosges Mountains and the Black Forest.  Mont Blanc is also just visible.

Access 
To get to the Schilthorn from the valley floor, a series of cable cars must be taken. The cable cars begin in Stechelberg leaving to Gimmelwald and then onto Mürren. From Mürren another cable car is taken to Birg, which is the final change before the Schilthorn. This cable airway is the longest and was the most technically challenging airway to be built. The other way up is to take the cable car from Lauterbrunnen to Grütschalp and a train to Mürren, from where the cable car must be taken. Between Birg and the summit, the cable car passes over Grauseeli, a small lake.

It is also possible to hike to the peak, along the myriad of small, but well-marked paths to the top. The hike to the top takes roughly five hours from Gimmelwald for a fit walker.

Piz Gloria
The panoramic revolving restaurant at the summit, Piz Gloria, was featured in the 1969 James Bond movie On Her Majesty's Secret Service. A black ski run featured in the film starts at the summit and leads down to the Engetal below Birg. The restaurant revolves a full 360 degrees in 45 minutes, slightly faster than the minute hand of a clock. 

After considering a number of locations, the stalled construction of the sports bar atop the Schilthorn was chosen when the film's producer financed the completion of the famous revolving platform, for the right to use the facility for his next film, the first and only Bond film starring George Lazenby.

A number of scenes in the film were photographed by cameraman John Jordan hanging below a speeding helicopter. Jordan had previously lost a foot to a helicopter rotor while filming the previous Bond movie You Only Live Twice. Within a year and fitted with a prosthetic limb, Jordan lost his footing and fell  to his death when filming similar aerial imagery used in the film Catch-22.

Inferno races
During the  winter, the Schilthorn is the traditional start for the world's longest downhill ski race, the "Inferno," which started  in 1928. It is the largest amateur ski race in the world.

During the summer, the Inferno Triathlon finishes at the summit after a run up from the Lauterbrunnen valley.

See also
List of mountains of Switzerland accessible by public transport
Bietenhorn, north-east of Schilthorn

References

External links

 Schilthorn - Piz Gloria
 Live Webcam at Schilthorn
 Schilthorn on Hikr
 Explorable north view (2.04 gigapixels)
 Explorable south view (2.09 gigapixels)
 Inferno Triathlon
 Schilthorn: Pictures

Bernese Alps
Mountains of Switzerland
Mountains of the Alps
Tourist attractions in Switzerland
Mountains of the canton of Bern
Two-thousanders of Switzerland